Moose Brook is a small community in the Canadian province of Nova Scotia, located in the municipality of East Hants in Hants County.

References
Moose Brook on Destination Nova Scotia

Communities in Hants County, Nova Scotia
General Service Areas in Nova Scotia